The Bradley Review of Higher Education was a review initiated by the Australian Government in March 2008. The purpose of the review was to consider and report on the future direction of the higher education sector and seek recommendations for reform and continuing improvement.

The Review was conducted by an independent expert panel and was led by Emeritus Professor Denise Bradley AC.

A discussion paper, "Review of Australian Higher Education," was released in June 2008. The report was released on 17 December 2008 under the title "Transforming Australia’s Higher Education System" 

The report recommended:
 high targets for participation in higher education, particularly amongst students from low socio-economic backgrounds
 promoting diversity and quality through the second by allocating funding according to student demand
 providing funding certainty in the sector
 a massive upgrade of university and TAFE infrastructure 
 establishing the Tertiary Education Quality and Standards Agency (TEQSA)to enhance quality and support accreditation
 reforms to student income support 
 additional support to regional tertiary education provision 
 developing better pathways between the higher education and vocational education and training sectors

Most significantly, perhaps, the Review recommended that Australia set a target that by 2020 40 per cent of 25- to 34-year-old Australians have a university degree. This has attracted a significant amount of media attention.

In the 2009 Budget, the Australian Government announced funds to support higher education and research over four years in a response to the Bradley Review, Transforming Australia’s Higher Education System. The purpose of the funds allocation was to "support high quality teaching and learning, improve access and outcomes for students from low socio-economic backgrounds, build new links between universities and disadvantaged schools, reward institutions for meeting agreed quality and equity outcomes, improve resourcing for research and invest in world class tertiary education infrastructure".

References 

Higher education in Australia